Raden Ngabehi Ranggawarsita (14 March 1802 – 24 December 1873) was a Javanese philosopher and poet. He was born into the famous literary Yasadipura family in Surakarta, in Central Java. He is sometimes called the last Javanese poet.

Biography 
Ranggawarsita was born in 1802 with the birth name Bagus Burham. He was son of Mas Pajangswara and grandson of Yasadipura II, a famous poet of Surakarta Sunanate. His father was the offspring of the Kingdom of Pajang, his mother of the Demak Sultanate. Once reaching adulthood, Ranggawarsita quickly gained a reputation for his intellectual capabilities which included authoring poetry, grammar books, and working as a redactor for the Dutch periodical Bromartani.

Works 
Ranggawarsita authored numerous texts that covered a myriad of subjects which included poetry, mysticism, and ethics. Additionally, his works included prophecies as well as criticism of the politics and society of his time.

Some of his notable works included:

 Serat Wirit Sopanalya 
 Serat Candrarani 
 Sapta dharma
 Sri Kresna Barata
 Paramayoga
 Pustakaraja Purwa
 Wirid Hidayat Jati

Several works by Ranggawarsita were republished posthumously by Tan Khoen Swie of Kediri in the early 20th century.

Legacy 
There is a museum in his name in Semarang.

Notes

References

External links
 

1802 births
Indonesian writers
People from Surakarta
Javanese poets
1873 deaths
19th-century poets